Salvon Ahmed (born December 30, 1998) is an American football running back for the Miami Dolphins of the National Football League (NFL). He played college football at Washington.

Professional career

San Francisco 49ers
After playing three years at Washington, Ahmed was signed by the San Francisco 49ers as an undrafted free agent on May 1, 2020, but was waived on August 25.

Miami Dolphins
On August 26, 2020, Ahmed was claimed off waivers by the Miami Dolphins. He was waived during final roster cuts on September 5, and signed to the practice squad two days later. On October 9, he was promoted to the active roster. In Week 9, he made his NFL debut against the Arizona Cardinals and had seven carries for 38 rushing yards. He earned his first start and scored his first professional rushing touchdown in 2020 against the Los Angeles Chargers.
In Week 15 against the New England Patriots, Ahmed rushed for 122 yards and a touchdown during the 22–12 win.

On March 10, 2023, Ahmed re-signed with the Dolphins on a one-year contract.

References

External links
Miami Dolphins bio
Washington Huskies football bio

1998 births
Living people
Players of American football from Washington (state)
African-American players of American football
American football running backs
Washington Huskies football players
San Francisco 49ers players
Sportspeople from Kirkland, Washington
Miami Dolphins players
21st-century African-American sportspeople